The Media City Footbridge is a swing-mechanism footbridge over the Manchester Ship Canal near MediaCityUK. It is an asymmetric cable-stayed swing bridge and was completed in 2011.
It was designed by Gifford (now part of the Ramboll Group) and Wilkinson Eyre.

The pedestrian bridge links MediaCityUK with the Imperial War Museum North on Trafford Wharf. It swings through 71 degrees to give a  navigation channel. The deck of the bridge is an orthotropic steel box. The bridge is supported by eight tapered steel fanned masts. It was built by Balfour Beatty, with the steel fabrication by Rowecord Engineering of Newport, South Wales.
The swing mechanism is built on a reinforced concrete caisson foundation of  diameter.

See also

 Salford Quays lift bridge

References

External links
 Rowecord Engineering
 Ramboll
 IStructE
 KGAL

Buildings and structures in Salford
Bridges in Greater Manchester
Bridges completed in 2011
Pedestrian bridges in England
Cable-stayed bridges in England
Swing bridges in England
2011 establishments in England
Salford Quays